Pedro Junqueira de Oliveira (born 23 March 2004), known as Pedro Junqueira or just Pedrinho, is a Brazilian professional footballer who plays as a forward for Goiás.

Club career
Born in Nerópolis, Goiás, Pedro Junqueira joined Goiás' youth setup in 2017. On 10 March 2022, renewed his contract until January 2025.

Pedro Junqueira made his first team – and Série A – debut on 28 May 2022, coming on as a second-half substitute for Reynaldo in a 1–1 home draw against Red Bull Bragantino.

Career statistics

References

External links
 Goiás profile 

2004 births
Living people
Sportspeople from Goiás
Brazilian footballers
Association football forwards
Campeonato Brasileiro Série A players
Goiás Esporte Clube players